Engelberger is a German surname. Notable people with the surname include:

John Engelberger (born 1976), German-American footballer
Joseph Engelberger (1925–2015), American engineer and businessman

See also
Engelberg (surname)

German-language surnames